The United States Ambassador to Norway (formally the Ambassador of the United States to the Kingdom of Norway) is the official representative of the President and the Government of the United States of America to the King and Government of Norway.

Since the United States was recognized as an independent country in 1783, it first established diplomatic relations with Norway in 1818 when Jonathan Russell was accepted as the Minister Plenipotentiary to Sweden and Norway. From 1814 to 1905, Sweden and Norway were in a personal union. Although each country was fully sovereign, they had a common foreign policy and diplomatic service. The United States Ambassador to Sweden thus was the US representative to Norway as well as Sweden. In 1905 Sweden and Norway peacefully separated and Norway continued to be an independent constitutional monarchy. On November 14, 1905, the US State Department instructed Ambassador Charles H. Graves to handle affairs for Sweden and Norway separately and the Ambassador was thus commissioned to Norway equally with Sweden, though he remained in Stockholm.

On June 22, 1906, Herbert H. D. Peirce was appointed to be the first ambassador of the US appointed specifically solely for Norway. On August 6, 1906, the embassy in Stockholm ceased all functions related to Norway. Peirce presented his credentials to the foreign minister of Norway on August 13, 1906.

List of Ambassadors

Notes

See also
Embassy of the United States, Oslo
Norway – United States relations
Foreign relations of Norway
Ambassadors of the United States

References
United States Department of State: Background notes on Norway

External links
 
 United States Ambassador's Residence in Oslo

Norway
 
United States